Non-fiction, or nonfiction, is an account or representation of a subject which is presented as existent outside of fantasy. 

Non-fiction or nonfiction may also refer to:

Music 
 "Non Fiction", a 2005 song by the Pillows
 Nonfiction (band), American rock band in the late 1980s
 Non Phixion, an American hip hop group
 "Nonfiction" (song), a 2022 song by Ayumi Hamasaki

Albums 
 Non-Fiction (Steve Kuhn album), 1978
 Non-Fiction (Bob Bennett album), 1985
 Non-Fiction (Black Sheep album), 1994
 Non-Fiction (Naturally 7 album), 2000
 Non-Fiction (Ne-Yo album), 2015

Other media 
 Stranger than Fiction: True Stories, a 2004 book by Chuck Palahniuk also published under the title Nonfiction
 Non-Fiction (film), a 2018 French comedy film

See also
True Story (disambiguation)